The following lists of football stadiums in France are ordered by capacity. Currently association football stadiums with a capacity of 5,000 or more are included.

French football stadiums below 20,000 capacity

French football stadiums below 10,000 capacity 

Stadiums with a capacity of at least 5,000 are included.

See also
List of European stadiums by capacity
List of rugby union stadiums in France
List of indoor arenas in France

Notes

References
Stades du Monde et de France

 
France
Football stadiums
Association football in France lists